Muppet Babies may refer to:
Muppet Babies (1984 TV series), the original 1984 series
Muppet Babies (2018 TV series), the reboot of the original 1984 series